Suheil Badi Bushrui (September 14, 1929 – September 2, 2015) was a professor, author, poet, critic, translator, and peace maker.
He was a prominent scholar in regard to the life and works of the Lebanese-American author and poet Kahlil Gibran.

Professor Suheil Badi Bushrui was a distinguished scholar, renowned for his contributions through his books, lectures and academic papers about the Irish poets W. B. Yeats, James Joyce , and other Irish literary figures, such as John Millington Synge. As for the Irish poet, W. B. Yeats, Professor Bushrui has done a lot to bring Yeats's poetry to the Arab-speaking audience, through his translations to Arabic. Professor Bushrui was unique in that he was the first non-westerner to attend the Summer School in Sligo, Ireland,  which opened in 1960, dedicated and named after Yeats, who grew up there and also spent his childhood holidays in Sligo's landscape. In accordance with this, Professor Bushrui wrote in 1962 his Ph.D. thesis in English Literature,  about Yeats's Plays, The Revisions, 1900 -  1910, during his doctoral studies at Southampton University, England, UK.

Childhood and early life
Suheil Bushrui was born in 1929 in Nazareth, Palestine. He attended the St. George's School in Jerusalem.

Career and accomplishments
Suheil Bushrui was the first Arab national to be appointed to the Chair of English at the American University of Beirut, a position he held from 1968 to 1986. He taught at universities in Africa, Europe, the Middle East, and America. He authored in both English and Arabic tens of books and scholarly articles on themes that ranged from literature to religion to world order. He was the first non-Westerner to be appointed as Chair of the International Association of the Study of Irish Literature.

Later in 1992, he became the first incumbent of the Baháʼí Chair for World Peace at the University of Maryland where he worked on developing alternatives to violent resolution of conflict, exploring spiritual solutions for the various global and social problems.

Subsequently and until early 2015 Bushrui became the Director of the Kahlil Gibran Chair for Values and Peace at the University of Maryland and was Senior Scholar of Peace Studies at the Center for International Development and Conflict Management.

Throughout his long career, he worked with generations of young people to promote a culture of peace. He was recognized in the many countries in which he taught (Sudan, Nigeria, the U.K., Canada, Lebanon and the U.S.), for the transformation he brought about in the lives of his students.

Accolades and honors
Throughout a long career, professor Bushrui received numerous accolades and honors, including:
 The Lebanese National Order of Merit.
 London University's Una Ellis-Fermor Literary Prize.
 The Silver Medal of Merit of the Vatican-sponsored Sacred and Military Constantinian Order of St. George.
 The University of Maryland's Outstanding Faculty Award.
 A Maryland Governor's Citation for excellence in education.
 The Life Achievement Award of the Alumni Association of the American University of Beirut.
 The Temple of Understanding's Juliet Hollister Award for exceptional service to interfaith understanding.

Bibliography 
Books authored (small selection):
 Kahlil Gibran of Lebanon. A re-evaluation of the life and works of the author of The Prophet (1987)
 The Love Letters of Kahlil Gibran to May Ziadah
 The Literary Heritage of the Arabs
 The Wisdom of the Arabs
 The World's Favourite Love Poems
  “Kahlil Gibran: Man and Poet” (with Joe Jenkins)
  "The Spiritual Heritage of the Human Race"
  “Speeches and Articles 1968-2012: His Royal Highness The Prince of Wales” (ed. with David Cadman)

 “Desert Songs of the Night: 1500 Years of Arab Literature” (Saqi Books, 2015)

References

External links
 Global Interfaith Conference on Sustainable Development Interview with Professor Suheil Badi Bushrui 
 Towards a Principle of Human Dignity (S. Bushrui) 
 Inaugural Lecture (4/6): Suheil Bushrui  
 Summary CV - University of Mayland
 Suheil Badiʼ Bushrui
 
 
 

1929 births
2015 deaths
20th-century Bahá'ís
21st-century Bahá'ís
Palestinian Baha'is
Academic staff of the American University of Beirut
W. B. Yeats scholars
University of Maryland, College Park faculty